Nesterovsky is a rural locality (a khutor) in Rechenskoye Rural Settlement, Alexeyevsky District, Volgograd Oblast, Russia. The population was 143 as of 2010.

Geography 
Nesterovsky is located on the left bank of the Akishevka River, 30 km southwest of Alexeyevskaya (the district's administrative centre) by road. Rechensky is the nearest rural locality.

References 

Rural localities in Alexeyevsky District, Volgograd Oblast